The Scarlet Letter is an American silent drama film distributed by Fox Film Corporation and based upon the 1850 eponymous novel by Nathaniel Hawthorne, with some additional plot added taking place before the events of the novel. It was written and directed by Carl Harbaugh. A print of the film exists. The film used the novel's text to create subtitles, and in 1917 The Moving Picture World called it "as nearly flawless as it is humanly possible for it to be."

Plot 
In old Puritan Boston some two hundred and fifty years ago, a girl was born. Her mother was Hester Prynne. Her father was "unknown." The Rev. Wilson and the Governor urge Hester to reveal the name of the child's father. She refuses and the Rev. Arthur Dimmesdale is asked to plead with her. She does not heed the pastor's request to reveal the name of the father of her child. A bent old man enters the square. He recognizes Hester and she him. Hate sweeps his face. Hester is taken back to prison and the old man, Chillingworth, is admitted to her cell as a physician. He is Hester's husband. He berates her and leaves, threatening to drag her lover from his hiding. Next day Hester goes to live in a cottage beyond the settlement. She endures insults and humiliation. Meantime, Rev. Dimmesdale's health gives way under a strange malady. Chillingworth is told to care for him.

Years pass and Pearl grows into girlhood. The heads of the colony seek to separate her from Hester and raise her under the church. Hester resists in vain, but Dimmesdale's plea saves the little family. Chillingworth comments on the earnestness of the pastor's plea. A few days later, Dimmesdale sees Pearl in the cemetery near his home. With burrs, she has formed an "A" on her breast. Dimmesdale staggers to his bed and falls unconscious. To revive the pastor, Chillingworth opens his shirt. He seems to see a scarlet "A" branded on Dimmesdale's chest. Chilingworth glares with fiendish glee. Regaining consciousness late in the night, the pastor runs into the square and mounts the pillory, crying out to the sleeping town. He faints and recovers as Hester and Pearl enter at dawn. He calls them and together they stand on the pillory. When the town begins to stir they go to the beach. Hester begs Dimmesdale to flee with her and the child to another land. The pastor embraces the woman and child. Chillingworth watches from behind a rock. In parting, Hester casts away the scarlet "A." Chillingworth cries out to the town that Hester has bewitched Dimmesdale. Guards seize her in her cottage and drag her to the square. Attracted by the tumult, Dimmesdale rushes into the square as Hester is being tied to the stake. Pushing through the frenzied mob he stands beside her. As he confesses himself the father of Pearl, he tears open his shirt and reveals an "A" seared on his chest. The throng draws back in awe. Hester frees herself and catches Dimmesdale as he falls. She lifts his head into her lap; he opens his eyes, kisses Hester and Pearl and dies.

Cast 
 Mary Martin as Hester Prynne
 Stuart Holmes as Arthur Dimmesdale
 Dan Mason as Roger Chillingworth
 Kittens Reichert as Pearl
 Edward Hoyt as the Reverend Wilson
 Robert Vivian as the Governor
 Florence Ashbrooke as Mistress Hibbons

References

External links 
 

1917 films
Films based on The Scarlet Letter
1910s English-language films
1917 drama films
American silent films
1910s American films
Silent American drama films